The Dominican Republic national basketball team represents the Dominican Republic in men's international basketball competitions. In 2011 and 2012, John Calipari, the head coach of the University of Kentucky men's basketball team, served as the head coach of the team. The team placed third in the 2011 FIBA Americas Championship and fourth in the 2012 FIBA World Olympic Qualifying Tournament, one position shy of qualifying for the 2012 Olympics.

Competitions

FIBA World Cup

FIBA AmeriCup

Pan American Games

Centrobasket Championship

Team

Current roster
Roster for the 2023 FIBA Basketball World Cup qualification.

Depth chart

Notable players
Al Horford
Karl-Anthony Towns
Ángel Delgado
Chris Duarte
Andrés Feliz

Past squads
1999 Americas Championship

Felipe López
Soterio Ramírez
Jaime Peterson
Rafael Novas
Franklin Western
Carlos Paniagua
Juan Carlos Martínez
Carlos Payano
Okaris Lenderborg
Ricardo Greer
Ricardo Vásquez
Derick Baker

2003 Central American and Caribbean Championship

Otto Ramírez
Carlos Paniagua
Luis Flores
Henry Lalane
Amaury Filion
Franklin Western
Marlon Martínez
Carlos Payano
José Vargas
Pedro Lenderborg
Juan Carlos Martínez
Jaime Peterson

2003 Pan American Games

Otto Ramírez
Carlos Paniagua
José Vargas
Carlos Payano
Franklin Western
Miguel Angel Pichardo
Amaury Filion
Luis Flores
Francisco García
Jeffrey Greer
Carlito Malalos
Jack Michael Martínez

2003 Americas Championship

Otto Ramírez
Carlos Paniagua
Henry Lalane
Carlos Morban
Henry Paulino
Franklin Western
Miguel Angel Pichardo
Carlos Payano
José Vargas
Amaury Filion
Víctor Ortega Rodríguez
Jaime Peterson

2004 Central American and Caribbean Championship

Otto Ramírez
Carlos Paniagua
Andy Turner
Cristian Arias
Marlon Martínez
Ricardo Soliver
Rafael Luis
Carlos Payano
Henry Lalane
Amaury Filion
Juan Carlos Martínez
Jack Michael Martínez

2005 Americas Championship

Otto Ramírez
Marlon Martínez
Luis Flores
Andy Turner
Josh Asselin
Amaury Filion
Cristian Arias
Francisco García
José Vargas
Luis Felipe López
JeanCarlo Gómez
Terry Smith

2006 Central American and Caribbean Championship

Ricardo Soliver
Henry Lalane
Andy Turner
Otto Ramírez
Franklin Western
Marlon Martínez
Elpidio Fortuna
Radhames Almonte
Amaury Filion
Elys Guzmán
Jack Michael Martínez

2006 Central American and Caribbean Games

José Cabrera
Elpidio Fortuna
Cristian Arias
Andy Turner
Otto Ramírez
Franklin Western
Marlon Martínez
Elys Guzmán
Radhames Almonte
Hendry Lalane
Jack Michael Martínez

2008 Ecuador

Francisco Ozuna
Carlos Morban
Elpidio Fortuna
Kelvin Peña
Cristian Arias
Franklin Western
Al Horford
Francisco García
Alexander Flores Assist Leader . Captain
Andres Sandoval
Eulis Báez
Jack Michael Martínez

FIBA Americas Championship 2009

Charlie Villanueva
Francisco García
Al Horford
Luis Flores
Jack Michael Martínez
Kelvin Peña
Carlos Morban
Franklin Western
Joey L Acosta

2014 FIBA Basketball World Cup

2015 Pan American Games

Jose Acosta
Ángel Delgado
Miguel Dicent
Andres Feliz
Manuel Fortuna
Juan Jose Garcia
Manuel Guzman
James Maye
Rigoberto Mendoza
Nehemias Morillo
Edward Santana
Gerardo Suero

Kit

Manufacturer
2019: Nike

Sponsor
2019: Collado

See also
Dominican Republic women's national basketball team
Dominican Republic national under-19 basketball team
Dominican Republic national under-17 basketball team
Dominican Republic national 3x3 team

References

External links

FIBA Profile
Latinbasket.com - Dominican Republic Men National Team

Videos
 Germany v Dominican Republic - Highlights - FIBA Basketball World Cup 2019 Youtube.com video

Men's national basketball teams
National team
Basketball
1954 establishments in the Dominican Republic